Aralia spinosa, commonly known as devil's walking stick, is a woody species of plant in the genus Aralia, family Araliaceae, native to eastern North America. The various names refer to the viciously sharp, spiny stems, petioles, and even leaf midribs. It has also been known as Angelica-tree.

This species is sometimes called Hercules' club, prickly ash, or prickly elder, common names it shares with the unrelated Zanthoxylum clava-herculis. For this reason, Aralia spinosa is sometimes confused with that species and mistakenly called the toothache tree, but it does not have the medicinal properties of Zanthoxylum clava-herculis.

Aralia spinosa is occasionally cultivated for its exotic, tropical appearance, having large lacy compound leaves. It is closely related to the Asian species Aralia elata, a more commonly cultivated species with which it is easily confused.

Description
The young stems are stout and thickly covered with sharp spines. The plants generally grow in clusters of branchless trunks, although stout wide-spreading branches are occasionally produced.

The fruit is a purplish-black berry  in diameter, ripening in the fall. The roots are thick and fleshy.

The petioles are prickly, with swollen bases. In the autumn the leaves turn to a peculiar bronze red touched with yellow which makes the tree conspicuous and attractive.

The habit of growth and general appearance of Aralia spinosa and related tree-forming Aralia species are unique. However, further north, the slender, swaying, palm-like appearance is most characteristic of younger plants that have not been damaged by winter storms.

 Bark: Light brown, divided into rounded broken ridges. Branchlets one-half to two-thirds of an inch in diameter, armed with stout, straight or curved, scattered prickles and nearly encircled by narrow leaf scars. At first light yellow brown, shining and dotted, later light brown.
 Wood: Brown with yellow streaks; light, soft, brittle, close-grained.
 Winter buds: Terminal bud chestnut brown, one-half to three-fourths of an inch long, conical, blunt; axillary buds flattened, triangular, one-fourth of an inch in length.
 Leaves: Clustered at the end of the branches, compound, bi- and tri-pinnate, three to four feet long, two and a half feet broad. The pinnae are unequally pinnate, having five or six pairs of leaflets and a long stalked terminal leaflet; these leaflets are often themselves pinnate. The last leaflets are ovate, two to three inches long, wedge-shaped or rounded at base, serrate or dentate, acute; midrib and primary veins prominent. They come out of the bud a bronze green, shining, somewhat hairy; when full grown are dark green above, pale beneath; midribs frequently furnished with prickles. Petioles stout, light brown, eighteen to twenty inches in length, clasping, armed with prickles. Stipules acute, one-half inch long.
 Flowers: July, August. Perfect or polygamomonoecious, cream white, borne in many-flowered umbels arranged in compound panicles, forming a terminal racemose cluster, three to four feet in length which rises, solitary or two or three together, above the spreading leaves. Bracts and bractlets lanceolate, acute, persistent.
 Calyx: Calyx tube coherent with the ovary, minutely five-toothed.
 Corolla: Petals five, white, inserted on margin of the disk, acute, slightly inflexed at the apex, imbricate in bud.
 Stamens: Five, inserted on margin of the disk, alternate with the petals; filaments thread-like; anthers oblong, attached on the back, introrse, two-celled; cells opening longitudinally.
 Pistil: Ovary inferior, five-celled; styles five, connivent; stigmas capitate.
 Fruit: Berry-like drupe, globular, black, one-fourth of an inch long, five-angled, crowned with the blackened styles. Flesh thin, dark.

Distribution and habitat
Aralia spinosa is widespread in the eastern United States, ranging from New York to Florida along the Atlantic coast, and westward to Ohio, Illinois, and Texas. It prefers a deep moist soil.  The plants typically grow in the forest understory or at the edges of forests, often forming clonal thickets by sprouting from the roots.

This tree was admired by the Iroquois because of its usefulness, and for its rarity. The Iroquois would take the saplings of the tree and plant them near their villages and on islands, so that animals wouldn't eat the valuable fruit. The fruit was used in many of the natives' foods. The women would take the flowers and put them in their hair because of the lemony smell. The flowers could also be traded for money.

In the past, botanists attributed occurrences of Aralia north of Maryland and Delaware in the Middle Atlantic states to introductions of Aralia spinosa from areas to the south. However some of these occurrences are now known to be of Aralia elata (Japanese Angelica-tree), a related Asian species that is invasive in the area. A. spinosa and A. elata are difficult to distinguish in the field, leading to confusion. In at least one locality, in Philadelphia, A. elata is displacing A. spinosa, with as yet unknown impacts on the local ecology.

Uses
The young leaves can be eaten if gathered before the prickles harden. They are then chopped finely and cooked as a potherb.

Aralia spinosa was introduced into cultivation in 1688 and is still grown for its decorative foliage, prickly stems, large showy flower panicles [clusters], and distinctive fall color. These plants are slow growing, tough and durable, do well in urban settings, but bear numerous prickles on their stems, petioles, and leaflets. These plants can be propagated from seeds or root cuttings.

Early American settlers used the plant for its alleged properties of curing toothaches.

In a laboratory study, extracts from the plant, used as a medicine during the American Civil War, showed antimicrobial activity against multidrug-resistant bacteria associated with wound infections.

References

External links

Aralia spinosa images at bioimages.vanderbilt.edu
 Grieve, M. Mrs. (1931) A Modern Herbal: Aralia spinosa

spinosa
Trees of the Northeastern United States
Trees of the Southern United States
Trees of the Southeastern United States
Trees of the South-Central United States
Leaf vegetables
Trees of the United States
Plants described in 1753
Taxa named by Carl Linnaeus
Trees of the Great Lakes region (North America)
Trees of North America
Trees of the Eastern United States